Mart-Olav Niklus (born 22 September 1934 Tartu) is an Estonian ornithologist, dissident and politician. He was a member of VII Riigikogu.

References

Living people
1934 births
Estonian ornithologists
Estonian dissidents
Estonian prisoners and detainees
Prisoners and detainees of the Soviet Union
Members of the Riigikogu, 1992–1995
Hugo Treffner Gymnasium alumni
University of Tartu alumni
Recipients of the Order of the White Star, 2nd Class
Politicians from Tartu